Jiří Krampol (born 11 July 1938) is a Czech film and theatre actor.

Krampol was born in Buštěhrad, Kladno District. He graduated at the Theatre Faculty of the Academy of Performing Arts in Prague in 1962.

He acted in Czech theatre Semafor from 1983 to 1990.

He is well known as a Czech voice dubber of Jean-Paul Belmondo and Louis de Funès, the latter succeeding his previous dubber František Filipovský.

Selected filmography 
 2009 – 2Bobule
 1988 – Chlapci a chlapi
 1986 – Forbidden Dreams
 1983 – Návštěvníci (TV series)
 1979 – Arabela (TV series)
 1975 – Operation Daybreak (as Adolf Opálka)
 1975 - Tam, kde hnízdí čápi
 1975 – Thirty Cases of Major Zeman
 1974 - Sokolovo

External links 
 
 

1938 births
Living people
People from Buštěhrad
Czech male film actors
Czech male television actors
Czech male voice actors
Czech television talk show hosts
Czech comedians
Academy of Performing Arts in Prague alumni